Liquid Sunshine is an album by Keziah Jones. Composer and musician Jocelyn Pook contributions to the songs Hello Heavenly, Runaway, and Teardrops Will Fall.

Drums, Bass & Guitar recorded by Paul Motion at Matrix Little Russell Street, Maison Rouge and Studdridge Street studios for Hello Heavenly, God's Glory, Liquid Sunshine, Runaway, Don't Forget & I'm Known.

Track listing
 "Hello Heavenly" 
 "God's Glory" 
 "Liquid Sunshine" 
 "New Brighter Day" 
 "Runaway" 
 "Don't Forget" 
 "Phased" 
 "I'm Known" 
 "Sunshineshapedbulletholes" 
 "Functional" 
 "Stabilah" 
 "Wounded Lovers Son" 
 "Teardrops Will Fall"

Charts

References

1999 albums
Keziah Jones albums